Loewe Technology GmbH (pronounced ) develops, manufactures and sells a wide variety of electronic, electrical and mechanical products and systems, and specialises in the field of consumer and communication technology. The company was founded in Berlin in 1923 by brothers Siegmund and David L. Loewe. The company has its headquarters and production facilities in Kronach, Upper Franconia.

Today, the range has expanded to include televisions, audio products, multiroom systems, speakers and racks. Loewe is also represented internationally by sales partners and subsidiaries. These include subsidiaries in the Benelux countries, France, Italy, Switzerland and the UK. There are exclusive Loewe Galeries acting as flagship stores in many cities around the world, including Amsterdam, Copenhagen, Hong Kong, Amman, London, Madrid, Moscow, Paris, Rome, and Vienna.

Company history 
The company was started in 1923 in Berlin, when Siegmund Loewe and his brother David Ludwig Loewe established a radio manufacturing company called Radiofrequenz GmbH. Their work with the young physicist Manfred von Ardenne in 1926 led to the development of the triple tube, which was first used in the Loewe OE333 radio receiver. This tube prompted Loewe's multi-tube production and is today lauded as the world's first integrated circuit.

Television development began at Loewe in 1929. The company worked together with British television pioneer John Logie Baird. In 1931, Manfred von Ardenne presented the world's first fully electronic television to the public on the Loewe stand at the 8th Berlin Radio Show.

When Hitler came to power in Germany, Siegmund Loewe was forced to emigrate to the US in 1938, where he developed a friendship with yet another forced emigrant, Albert Einstein. Funkabwehr agents obtained radio detection-finders vans from the Loewe-Opta-Radio Company to be used against espionage in Belgium.

In 1949, Siegmund Loewe regained possession of the company's property and took over as chairman of the supervisory board. In the 1950s, Loewe began producing the Optaphon, the first cassette tape recorder, and manufacturing televisions in Kronach. 1961 saw the first European video recorder, the Optacord 500, enter mass production.

In 1962, the family company tradition ended with the death of Siegmund Loewe. Subsidiaries of the Philips group took over the majority of shares. Under this management, which continued until 1985, the company specialised increasingly in the development and production of televisions.

In 1963, the first portable television, Loewe Optaport, was launched. It had a 25 cm screen and built-in FM radio. The first Loewe colour televisions were launched along with the introduction of colour television in Germany. In 1979 Loewe introduced a fully integrated chassis (everything on a single board) television production. The first European stereo television followed in 1981.

In 1985, management made Loewe a privately owned company again after Philips sold its shares. In the same year, Loewe created the Art 1, a new generation of TVs with a focus on design.

The CS1 represented another international first in 1995 as the world's first fully recyclable television. At this time, the course was also set for systematic further development as a multimedia specialist.

1998 marked two more milestones in the company history: the launch of the Xelos @ media, the first television with internet access, and that of the Spheros, the first Loewe flat-screen television. In the following year, Loewe AG had its IPO, led by Rainer Hecker (CEO) and Burkhard Bamberger (CFO).

With the Individual, the first flat-screen TV with individual housing options, set-up solutions and inset colours, Loewe became a premium flat-screen TV manufacturer. LED technology was adopted at Loewe in 2010 in the new Individual. In the following year, Loewe introduced 3D picture display to its Individual range.

Following financial hardships, in July 2013 the company filed for bankruptcy protection, but after subsequent severe financial losses, on 1 October 2013 the Loewe Group declared bankruptcy and entered in a self-administration insolvency process. The protective proceedings for Loewe AG and Loewe Opta GmbH have transitioned into a self-administration insolvency process (German: "Insolvenzverfahren in Eigenverwaltung"). The Coburg insolvency court approved a request on this matter from Loewe's management and confirmed self-administration. The business will remain fully operational beyond 1 October 2013.

On 17 January 2014, the company announced that Loewe's management board reached an agreement with an investor group composed of German family-run companies and former Apple and Bang & Olufsen managers.  However their takeover of major assets from Loewe AG failed.

In March 2014 major assets from Loewe AG were taken by the Munich-based investor Stargate Capital GmbH. This secures the future of the traditional Loewe brand in Germany, under German ownership. 

In May 2019, Loewe similar to 2013, announced a financial recovery in self-administration, due to "continuing market weaknesses in televisions". It was announced that the shareholders are now Clearsight Turnaround Fund of Luxembourg and Tube Capital Partners from Switzerland.

In December 2019, Skytec Group Ltd took over the brand. Since then, several changes have happened in the brand; being the main one, the use of the components and operating system Vidaa U of the Chinese multinational Hisense.

Products 

Type FEB

In 1929 Loewe started producing televisions. Manfred von Ardenne focused on electronic circuits. On 14 December 1930, with the help of the cathode ray tube, he first succeeded in full electronic transmission of diapositives. Consequently, the first public broadcast of movies took place in 1931 and two years later, Loewe presented the first Type FEB ready for serial production.

Loewe Optaport

In 1963, Loewe designed the first fully transistorized and portable TV, the “Optaport”. The device had a screen diagonal of 9.8 inches and was equipped with an integrated ultra-short wave radio section.

Art 1

In February 1981, Loewe presented the first stereo sound TV in Europe. Four years later they introduced the “Art 1”, a newly design- and technic-oriented generation of televisions.

D2-MAC

The D2MAC method for TV components allowed digital sound to be transmitted stereo or in various languages. The image transmission came close to studio quality due to RGB component transmission. Loewe participated in the use of modernized European TV technology by building the first German TV device with an internally pluggable D2-MAC decoder, Sat-TV turner and PiP modules. The 16:9 television tubes already enabled a standard resolution of the first trial and live broadcasting of the Olympic Games in 1992. However, the 1250 lines HDTV did not manage to establish itself and was pulled off the market after the distribution of German programmes via Astra.

CS1

The first environmentally friendly “CS1” went into production in 1995. The device essentially consisted of ceramics, copper, aluminium, silicon and iron. Television tubes could be disposed of separately while the casing cover and electronics were designed such that they could be completely melted down for reuse. Hence, it was possible to disassemble the CS1 in order to recycle the components.

Xelos@media & Spheros

From 1995 onwards, Loewe kept evolving from classic consumer electronics to a multimedia specialist. In 1997, Loewe introduced the “Xelos@media” – the first TV with internet access. In the same year, the first Loewe flat-screen TV “Spheros” debuted.

MultiTel TV 10

In 1988, the MultiTel TV 10 proved the latest dynamics of communication electronics that could be performed by TV devices at that time. Telephoning, keeping a name register, database queries, sending telexes and telefax and using the entire media bandwidth was made possible with no more than one, compact device.

Individual, Art & Connect

“Individual” was the first flat-screen TV that offered individual housing options and set-up solutions as well as inset colours and enabled Loewe's breakthrough as a premium manufacturer. The “Loewe Connect”, introduced in 2008, was the first Smart-TV worldwide with a fully integrated linkage that offered cable-free access to multi-media files, external hard drive, and PC systems.

In 2010 Loewe developed its first batch-produced LCD TV with LED background lighting, the next generation “Individual SL”. In the same year, the LED series “Art” and “Connect” with DR+Streaming, MediaText, HbbTV, CE-HTML and an improved streaming client were introduced at the IFA exhibition. The increasing intelligent networking of modern homes was integrated with functions like “Follow-Me,“ which enables the user to record or start watching a movie in one room and finish watching it in another room, enabling a multi-room function.

bild, klang, plus

In 2016, Loewe introduced a German nomenclature of its products in order to "authentically communicate its German roots". The German product names are supposed to convey the use of the respective products within the entertainment system: bild (TV devices), klang (speakers), and plus (accessories).

Nominations 
At the 63rd iF Design Award presentation, held in BMW-Welt in Munich on 10 March 2017, Loewe Technologies GmbH, Germany's premium consumer electronics manufacturer, was selected from over 5,500 entries from 59 countries to receive five international awards. The Loewe bild 7 television and the Loewe klang 5 wireless speaker system received the iF Gold Award, while the Loewe bild 3, the klang 5 subwoofer, and the Loewe os user interface were honoured with iF Design Awards in the "Product" category.

Loewe won five awards at the German Design Awards for innovative products with trendsetting designs, which were presented during the “Ambiente” trade fair for consumer goods in Frankfurt on 10 February. Three awards were given for audio products, including the new Loewe klang 5 wireless active speakers and subwoofer and Loewe klang 1 subwoofer, and the two for the TV sets Loewe bild 7 with OLED technology and Loewe bild 1.

Literature 
 75 Jahre Loewe (1923-1998). Und die Zukunft geht weiter, author's edition 1998
 Kilian J.L. Steiner: Ortsempfänger, Volksfernseher und Optaphon. Die Entwicklung der deutschen Radio- und Fernsehindustrie und das Unternehmen Loewe 1923–1962. Klartext Verlag, Essen 2005, 
 Frank Keuper, Jürgen Kindervater, Heiko Dertinger, Andreas Heim (Hrsg.): Das Diktat der Markenführung. 11 Thesen zur nachhaltigen Markenführung und -implementierung. Mit einem umfassenden Fallbeispiel der Loewe AG, Gabler Fachverlage, Wiesbaden 2009,

References

External links 

 

German brands
Electronics companies of Germany
Companies based in Bavaria
Electronics companies established in 1923
1923 establishments in Germany
Companies acquired from Jews under Nazi rule
Radio manufacturers